The Cheshire Plate is an annual rugby union knock-out club competition organised by the Cheshire Rugby Football Union.  It was introduced in 1981 for teams that were eliminated from the preliminary and 1st rounds of the Cheshire Cup, with Old Instonians being the first ever winners. Initially the secondary competition in the region, in recent years the Plate has become stand-alone competition open to club sides based in either Cheshire, Merseyside or the Isle of Man that are ranked at tier 8 (South Lancs/Cheshire 2) and 9 (South Lancs/Cheshire 3) of the English league system – although some teams that compete are invited come from outside the official league structure.  It is currently the fourth most important club competition organised by the Cheshire RFU behind the Cheshire Bowl (3rd), Cheshire Vase (2nd) and Cheshire Cup (1st).

The present format is as a knock-out cup with a quarter-final, semi-final and final which is held at a neutral venue during the latter stages of the season (March–May).  At present Cheshire Plate finals are held on the same date and same venue as the more prestigious Cheshire Cup final.

Cheshire Plate winners

Number of wins

Oldershaw (5)
Crewe & Nantwich (3)
Port Sunlight (3)
Runcorn (3)
Wallasey (3)
Ashton-on-Mersey (2)
Macclesfield (2)
New Brighton (2)
Northwich (2)
Southern Nomads (2)
Altrincham Kersal (1)
Anselmians (1)
Chester (1)
Davenport (1)
Ellesmere Port (1)
Holmes Chapel (1)
Old Instonians (1)
Sale FC (1)
Sandbach (1)
Stockport (1)
Wilmslow (1)
Wirral (1)

Notes

See also
 Cheshire RFU
 Cheshire Cup
 Cheshire Vase
 Cheshire Bowl
 English rugby union system
 Rugby union in England

References

External links
Cheshire RFU

Recurring sporting events established in 1981
1981 establishments in England
Rugby union cup competitions in England
Rugby union in Cheshire